Faulad is a 1963 Bollywood film written by Mulkraj Bhakri and Farooq Kaisser and directed by Mohammed Hussain, starring Dara Singh, Mumtaz, Minu Mumtaz, and Randhir.

The film duration is 145 minutes.

Plot
An astrologer shares a prediction with his Maharaja (Kamal Mehra) that in 18 years his daughter will marry a lower caste man who will push him from the throne. The frightened ruler immediately orders that all newborn lower caste male children be killed. But one boy's mother places her infant son into a basket, and floats him down the river. A royal maid (Praveen Paul) finds the child and saves him and raises him within the royal court. Over the next 18 years the boy grows to become the adult Amar (Dara Singh). He soon falls in love with the Maharaja's daughter (Mumtaz) and is appointed head of the Royal Site since the Maharajah believes him to be of noble birth.  The scheming Prime Minister has his own designs on the princess, and it is not long before he orchestrates Amar's falling out of favor.

Cast 

 Dara Singh as Amar
 Mumtaz as Rajkumari Padma
 Minu Mumtaz as Veena 
 Kamran
 Randhir as Mantri
 Shyam Kumar
 Ratnamala as Amar's Mom
 Kamal Mehra as Maharaja
 Praveen Paul as Ranjit Singh's Wife 
 Uma Dutt as Thakur Ranjit Singh
 Habib as Soldier
 Baburao
 Vishwas Kunte
 Jamal
 Kamal Mohan
 Nazir Kashmiri
 Arvind
 Sabir
 Moolchand as Captive / Bandit / Fisherman

Music

References

External links
 

Films scored by G. S. Kohli
1960s Hindi-language films